Willem Lodewijk, Baron de Vos van Steenwijk (10 July 1859 – 12 April 1947) was a conservative Dutch politician.

He was a son of Jan Arend Godert de Vos van Steenwijk, who was president of the senate of the Netherlands from 1874 until 1880. He was a member of the Christelijk Historische Unie (CHU) and president of Senate from 1929 to 1946. He was preceded by Jan Joseph Godfried van Voorst tot Voorst and was in turn succeeded by the socialist Roelof Kranenburg.

Honours
De Vos van Steenwijk has received the following honours:
: Knight Grand Cross of the Order of the Netherlands Lion

References

1859 births
1947 deaths
People from Dalfsen
Christian Historical Union politicians
20th-century Dutch politicians
Presidents of the Senate (Netherlands)
Members of the Senate (Netherlands)
Barons of the Netherlands